File Manager is a file manager program bundled with releases of OS/2 and Microsoft Windows between 1988 and 1999 and available from 6 April 2018 as an optional download for all modern releases of Windows, including Windows 10.  

It is a single-instance graphical interface, replacing the command-line interface of MS-DOS, to manage files (copy, move, open, delete, search, etc.) and MS-DOS Executive file manager from previous Windows versions. Although File Manager was included in Windows 95 and Windows NT 4.0 and some later versions, Windows Explorer was introduced and used as the primary file manager, with file management via a two-pane view different from that of File Manager, and a single-pane view obtained by clicking a "My Computer" icon.

Overview
The program's interface showed a list of directories on the left hand panel, and a list of the current directory's contents on the right hand panel. File Manager allowed a user to create, rename, move, print, copy, search for, and delete files and directories, as well as to set permissions (attributes) such as archive, read-only, hidden or system, and to associate file types with programs. Also available were tools to label and format disks, manage folders for file sharing and to connect and disconnect from a network drive. On Windows NT systems it was also possible to set ACLs on files and folders on NTFS partitions through the shell32 security configuration dialog (also used by Explorer and other Windows file managers). On NTFS drives, individual files or entire folders could be compressed or expanded.

The Windows NT version of File Manager allows users to change directory, file, local, network and user permissions.

From Windows 95 and Windows NT 4.0 onward, File Manager was superseded by Windows Explorer. However, the WINFILE.EXE program file was still included with Windows 95-98 and Windows Me (16-bit executable), and Windows NT 4.0 (32-bit executable). The last 32-bit WINFILE.EXE build (4.0.1381.318) was distributed as part of Windows NT 4.0 Service Pack 6a (SP6a) in 1999, while the last 16-bit WINFILE.EXE build (4.90.3000) was distributed as part of Windows Me in 2000.

Chris Guzak was the shell developer on the Windows 3.1 team responsible for File Manager.

The source code was released on GitHub in 2018 with an MIT license by Microsoft.

Versions

16-bit OS/2 and Windows 3.x

File Manager was introduced in OS/2 versions 1.1, 1.2 and 1.3, with the first version released in 1988. It was initially called "File System" in OS/2 1.1 and the name of the executable was PMFILE.EXE. The "PM" stood for Presentation Manager, the GUI of OS/2 first introduced with version 1.1.

The original version of File Manager was a 16-bit program that supported the 8.3 file names that were in use at the time. It did not support the extended file names that became available in Windows 95 – including long file names and file names containing spaces. Instead, it would display only the first six characters followed by a tilde character ("~") and a number, usually 1. More numbers (2, 3, and so on) were added after the tilde if more than one file name with the same initial characters existed in the same directory.

The 16-bit version of File Manager was introduced into the Windows operating system starting with Windows 3.0 in 1990. The 16-bit version distributed with Windows 3.1x and Windows for Workgroups 3.1x installations had a Y2K issue due to lexicographic correlation between date representation and the ASCII character set; colons and semicolons replaced what should have been '2000'. Microsoft issued corrected binaries for all Windows 3.1x environments in 1997.

Windows NT
File Manager was rewritten as a 32-bit program for Windows NT. This new version correctly handled long file names in addition to NTFS file systems. It was included with Windows NT 3.1, 3.5, 3.51, and 4.0.

Windows 10
On April 6, 2018, Microsoft released binaries and the source code, licensed under the MIT License, for an improved version of File Manager running on Windows 10. This version included changes such as the ability to compile in modern versions of Visual Studio, the ability to compile as a 64-bit application, and numerous usability improvements. Microsoft also released this app in the Microsoft Store for free in late January 2019.

See also

 DOS Shell
 List of formerly proprietary software

References

External links

Windows File Manager on Microsoft Store

Discontinued Windows components
File managers for Microsoft Windows
Formerly proprietary software
Free and open-source software
Microsoft free software
Software using the MIT license
Windows components
Windows-only free software
1990 software